Dream Lovers is a 1986 Hong Kong romantic fantasy film directed by Tony Au. The film stars Chow Yun-fat as Song Yu, a famous orchestra conductor who recently has visions of a beautiful woman and a Qin dynasty era terracotta statue. When Song visits the statues, he meets Cheung Yuet-heung (Brigitte Lin), who also has dreams of a long lost lover. but with her visions being more violent. The two meet with a medium who tells them that they are the reincarnations of a pair of lovers who were murdered hundreds of years earlier.

Dream Lovers was Au's second film following 1983's Last Affair where he again worked with Chow. The film grossed over HK$7 million on its release and was nominated for four awards at the 6th Hong Kong Film Awards, where Law Wing-fai won the award for Best Original Film Score.

Plot

Cast
 Chow Yun-fat as Song Yu
 Brigitte Lin as Cheng Yuet-heung
 Cher Yueng as Wah-lei
 Kwan Shan as Har-nam
 Elaine Jin as Har-nam's wife
 Lam Chung as Li Chang

Production
The film was a production of D&B Films. The film starred Chow Yun-fat and Brigitte Lin, the only film where the two star together. Chow had previously worked with director Tony Au on the 1982 film, Last Affair. Dream Lovers was one of the first Hong Kong films to utilize the popular Terracotta Warrior figures that were excavated from Qin Shi Huangs tomb in 1974.

Release
Dream Warriors was released in Hong Kong on 25 April 1986 and grossed a total of HK$7,289,958 during its theatrical run. The film was released on VHS by Tai Seng Entertainment, on Laserdisc by Mei Ah Entertainment and on VCD and DVD by Mega Star Video.

Reception
At the 6th Hong Kong Film Awards, Law Wing-fai won the award for Best Original Film Score. Cher Yeung was nominated for Best Supporting Actress for her role as Wah-lei. Bill Wong was nominated for Best Cinematography and William Chang was nominated for Best Art Direction.

In his book The Hong Kong Filmography, 1977-1997, author Charles Strong gave the film a nine out of ten rating stating that "aside from fine work by Chow and Lin, and Au's artful compositions, the main asset here is Law Wing-fai's award-winning score". Jonathan Crow for the online film database Allmovie gave the film a four out of five star rating.

See also
 List of Hong Kong films of 1986
 List of fantasy films of the 1980s

References

External links
 
 

1980 films
1980s romantic fantasy films
Hong Kong romantic fantasy films
1980s Cantonese-language films
1980s Hong Kong films